West Philadelphia, Pennsylvania may refer to:

 West Philadelphia
 West Philadelphia Borough, Pennsylvania